Desta "Gadi" Yevarkan (born 1 January 1981) is an Israeli politician. He was elected to the Knesset for Likud in 2020, having previously served as a Knesset member for the Blue and White alliance between 2019 and 2020.

Biography
Yevarkan was born in Ethiopia. His family emigrated to Israel in 1991 as part of Operation Solomon, and initially settled in Tiberias before moving to a caravan site in kibbutz Hulda. He attended the Mikveh Israel boarding school. During his national service in the Israel Defense Forces, he served in the reconnaissance unit of the Givati Brigade, reaching the rank of lieutenant. He subsequently studied for a bachelor's degree in law at the College of Management.

Yevarkan ran for a place on the Likud list for the 2009 and 2013 Knesset elections, but was unsuccessful on both occasions. In the 2013 municipal elections he headed the Ethiopian immigrant-dominated Ahdut (Unity) list in Rehovot. In 2016 he founded the Be'eri Mechina.

In the build-up to the April 2019 elections, Yevarkan joined the new Telem party. After the party became part of the Blue and White alliance, he was given the thirty-third slot on the joint list, and was subsequently elected to the Knesset as the alliance won 35 seats, and was re-elected in the September 2019 elections. However, prior to the March 2020 elections he was removed from the Blue and White list after threatening to defect to Likud. He was subsequently given the twentieth slot on the Likud list for the elections, and resigned from the Knesset. He was replaced as an MK by Yorai Lahav-Hertzano. He returned to the Knesset after the elections, as Likud won thirty-six seats. For the 2021 elections, Yevarkan was placed seventeenth on Likud's list and retained his seat in the Knesset, as Likud won thirty seats.

References

External links

1981 births
Living people
Black Jewish members of the Knesset
Blue and White (political alliance) politicians
Deputy ministers of Israel
Ethiopian emigrants to Israel
Ethiopian Jews
Israeli Jews
Israeli people of Ethiopian-Jewish descent
Jewish Israeli politicians
Likud politicians
Members of the 21st Knesset (2019)
Members of the 22nd Knesset (2019–2020)
Members of the 23rd Knesset (2020–2021)
Members of the 24th Knesset (2021–2022)
Telem (2019 political party) politicians